Mariza canta Amália is the eighth studio album by fado singer Mariza. It was released in 2020 by Warner Music Portugal. The album peaked at No. 1 on the Associação Fonográfica Portuguesa chart.

Track listing
 Com Que Voz	4:16
 Barco Negro	4:45
 Lágrima	3:40
 Formiga Bossa Nova	3:19
 Estranha Forma De Vida	3:15
 Cravos De Papel	2:37
 Povo Que Lavas No Rio	4:43
 Foi Deus	3:41
 Gaivota	3:29
 Fado Português	4:49

References

Mariza albums
2020 albums
Portuguese-language albums
Warner Music Group albums